The National Bureau of Economic Research (NBER) is an American private nonprofit research organization "committed to undertaking and disseminating unbiased economic research among public policymakers, business professionals, and the academic community". The NBER is known for providing start and end dates for recessions in the United States.

Many chairpersons of the Council of Economic Advisers were previously NBER Research Associates, including the former NBER president and Harvard Professor, Martin Feldstein. The NBER's president and CEO is James M. Poterba of MIT.

History
The NBER was founded in 1920.  Its first staff economist, director of research, and one of its founders was American economist Wesley Clair Mitchell. He was succeeded by Malcolm C. Rorty in 1922.

The Russian American economist Simon Kuznets, a student of Mitchell, was working at the NBER when the U.S. government recruited him to oversee the production of the first official estimates of national income, published in 1934.

In the early 1940s, Kuznets's work on national income became the basis of official measurements of GNP and other related indices of economic activity.  The NBER is currently located in Cambridge, Massachusetts with a branch office in New York City.

Research
The NBER's research activities are mostly identified by 20 research programs on different subjects and 14 working groups. The research programs are: Aging, Asset Pricing, Behavioral/Macro, Capital Markets and the Economy, Children, Corporate Finance, Development of the American Economy, Economics of Education, Economic Fluctuations and Growth, Energy and the Environment, Health Care, Health Economics, Industrial Organization, International Finance and Macroeconomics, International Trade and Investment, Labor Studies, Law and Economics, Monetary Economics, Political Economy, Productivity, and Public Economics. From this research come the NBER's Working Papers.

Conferences
The NBER convenes over 120 meetings each year at which researchers share and discuss their latest findings and launch new projects. The Summer Institute, a collection of nearly 50 smaller meetings, is held annually in July.

Notable members

Winners of the Nobel Memorial Prize in Economic Sciences 
(In descending chronological order and by last name)

 Ben Bernanke, 2022
 Joshua Angrist, 2021
 David Card, 2021
 Guido Imbens, 2021
 Abhijit Banerjee, 2019
 Esther Duflo, 2019
 Michael Kremer, 2019
 William Nordhaus, 2018
 Paul Romer, 2018
 Richard Thaler, 2017
 Oliver Hart, 2016
 Bengt Holmström, 2016
 Angus Deaton, 2015
 Lars Peter Hansen, 2013
 Robert J. Shiller, 2013
 Alvin E. Roth, 2012
 Thomas J. Sargent, 2011
 Christopher A. Sims, 2011
 Peter Diamond, 2010
 Dale T. Mortensen, 2010
 Paul Krugman, 2008
 Finn E. Kydland, 2004
 Edward C. Prescott, 2004
 Robert F. Engle, 2003
 George Akerlof, 2001
 Joseph Stiglitz, 2001
 James Heckman, 2000
 Daniel McFadden, 2000
 Robert C. Merton, 1997
 Myron Scholes, 1997
 Robert Lucas Jr., 1995
 Robert Fogel, 1993
 Gary Becker, 1992
 George Stigler, 1982
 Theodore Schultz, 1979
 Milton Friedman, 1976
 Wassily Leontief, 1973
 Simon Kuznets, 1971

Council of Economic Advisers (CEA) Chairs
(In descending chronological order)

 Cecilia Rouse (2021–present)
 Alan Krueger (2011–2013)
 Austan Goolsbee (2010–2011)
 Christina Romer (2009–2010)
 Edward Lazear (2006–2009)
 Ben Bernanke (2005–2006)
 Harvey S. Rosen (2005)
 Greg Mankiw (2003–2005)
 Glenn Hubbard (2001–2003)
 Janet Yellen (1997–1999)
 Joseph Stiglitz (1995–1997)
 Michael Boskin (1989–1993)
 Martin Feldstein (1982–1984)
 Arthur F. Burns (1953–1956)

Other notable members
(In alphabetical order by last name)

 Daron Acemoglu
 Alberto Alesina
 Robert Barro
 Aaron Edlin
 John Lipsky
 Francis Longstaff
 Alan Marcus
 James A. Robinson
 Richard N. Rosett
 Anna Schwartz
 Eduardo Schwartz
 Andrei Shleifer
 Richard Zeckhauser

Funding
According to the NBER, they are funded by grants from government agencies, private foundations, by corporate and individual contributions, and by income from the NBER's investment portfolio. The largest donators currently are the National Institute of Health, the National Science Foundation, the Social Security Administration, and the Alfred P. Sloan Foundation. In 2015, NBER's annual revenue was about $33 million.

Policy impact
In a 2010 report by the University of Pennsylvania, the NBER was ranked as the second most influential domestic economic policy think tank (the first was the Brookings Institution).

Recession markers
The NBER is also known for its start and end dates of US recessions. The NBER is claimed by some to serve the role as an arbiter of whether the U.S. is in a recession or not. The origins of this role can be traced to the 1960s when the Commerce Department began publishing a digest that relied on NBER's analysis of the business cycle. The recession markers are made by the Business Cycle Dating Committee, whose eight members are selected by the president of the NBER. The eight members tend to be highly distinguished economists. The committee's meetings are held on the third floor of NBER's headquarters. The meetings are neither publicized nor on a fixed schedule. The board's decisions are not always unanimous, but the disagreements within the committee tend not to be about the presence of a recession; rather they are about the specific start and end points of the recession.

The NBER uses a broader definition of a recession than commonly appears in the media. A definition of a recession commonly used in the media is two consecutive quarters of a shrinking gross domestic product (GDP). In contrast, the NBER defines a recession as "a significant decline in economic activity spread across the economy, lasting more than a few months, normally visible in real GDP, real income, employment, industrial production, and wholesale-retail sales".  Business cycle dates are determined by the NBER dating committee. Typically, these dates correspond to peaks and troughs in real GDP, although not always so.

The NBER prefers this method for a variety of reasons. First, they feel by measuring a wide range of economic factors, rather than just GDP, a more accurate assessment of the health of an economy can be gained. For instance, the NBER considers not only the product-side estimates like GDP, but also income-side estimates such as the gross domestic income (GDI). Second, since the NBER wishes to measure the duration of economic expansion and recession at a fine grain, they place emphasis on monthly—rather than quarterly—economic indicators.  Finally, by using a looser definition, they can take into account the depth  of decline in economic activity.  For example, the NBER may declare not a recession simply because of two quarters of very slight negative growth, but rather an economic stagnation. However, they do not precisely define what is meant by "a significant decline", but rather determine if one has existed on a case by case basis after examining their catalogued factors which have no defined grade scale or weighting factors. The subjectivity of the determination has led to criticism and accusations committee members can "play politics" in their determinations.

Though not listed by the NBER, another factor in favor of this alternate definition is that a long-term economic contraction may not always have two consecutive quarters of negative growth, as was the case in the recession following the bursting of the dot-com bubble. For example, a repeated sequence of quarters with significant negative growth followed by a quarter of no or slight positive growth would not meet the traditional definition of a recession, even though the nation would be undergoing continuous economic decline.

Announcement of end of 2007–2009 recession
In September 2010, after a conference call with its Business Cycle Dating Committee, the NBER declared that the Great Recession in the United States had officially ended in 2009 and lasted from December 2007 to June 2009. In response, a number of newspapers wrote that the majority of Americans did not believe the recession was over, mainly because they were still struggling and because the country still faced high unemployment. However, the NBER release had noted that "In determining that a trough occurred in June 2009, the committee did not conclude that economic conditions since that month have been favorable or that the economy has returned to operating at normal capacity. Rather, the committee determined only that the recession ended and a recovery began in that month. A recession is a period of falling economic activity spread across the economy, lasting more than a few months, normally visible in real GDP, real income, employment, industrial production, and wholesale-retail sales. The trough marks the end of the declining phase and the start of the rising phase of the business cycle."

See also
Economic Cycle Research Institute

References

External links
 Official website

 
1920 establishments in the United States
1920 in economics
Economic research institutes
Non-profit organizations based in Massachusetts
Organizations established in 1920
Political and economic think tanks in the United States
Research institutes in Massachusetts